Theta Columbae, also named Elkurud , is a solitary star in the southern constellation of Columba. It is faintly visible to the naked eye, having an apparent visual magnitude of 5.02. Based upon parallax measurements taken during the Hipparcos mission, it is roughly  distant from the Sun. At its present distance, the visual magnitude of the star is reduced by an interstellar extinction factor of 0.11. It is currently moving away from the Sun with a radial velocity of 45.3 km/s.

This is an evolving B-type subgiant star with a stellar classification of B8 IV, having recently left the main sequence. It is spinning rapidly with a projected rotational velocity of 249 km/s. The star has an estimated four times the mass of the Sun. It radiates 472 times the solar luminosity from its outer atmosphere at an effective temperature of 9,916 K.

Nomenclature 

θ Columbae, Latinised to Theta Columbae, is the star's Bayer designation.

Early Arab poets referred to a number of anonymous stars as الفرود al-furūd, "the solitary ones". Later Arabian astronomers attempted to identify this name with particular stars, principally in the modern constellations Centaurus and Colomba. Allen (1899) noted the accepted etymology but suggested that al-furūd might have been an old transcriber's error for القرود al-qurūd "the apes", which he rendered "Al Ḳurūd", though this suggested has not received scholarly support.

In 2016, the IAU organized a Working Group on Star Names (WGSN) to catalog and standardize proper names for stars. The WGSN approved the name Elkurud for this star on 1 June 2018, and it is now so included in the List of IAU-approved Star Names. (The historical form Furud was chosen for Zeta Canis Majoris.)

References

B-type subgiants
Columba (constellation)
Columbae, Theta
Durchmusterung objects
042167
029034
02177